Sarbiewo  (German: Mückenburg in der Neumark) is a village in the administrative district of Gmina Zwierzyn, within Strzelce-Drezdenko County, Lubusz Voivodeship, in western Poland.

References

Sarbiewo